Richard Elliott Neustadt (June 26, 1919 – October 31, 2003) was an American political scientist specializing in the United States presidency. He also served as adviser to several presidents. He was the author of the books Presidential Power and, with Harvey V. Fineberg, The Swine Flu Affair: Decision-Making on a Slippery Disease.

Early life
Neustadt was born in Philadelphia, Pennsylvania, the son of Elizabeth (Neufeld) and Richard Mitchells Neustadt, who was a progressive activist and social worker. His family were Jews whose ancestors were from Central Europe. Neustadt received a BA in History from the University of California, Berkeley in 1939, followed by an M.A. degree from Harvard University in 1941. After a short stint as an economist in the Office of Price Administration, he joined the US Navy in 1942, where he was a supply officer in the Aleutian Islands; Oakland, California; and Washington. He then went into the Bureau of Budget (now known as the Office of Management and Budget) while he was working on his Harvard Ph.D., which he received in 1951.

Political career

Neustadt was the Special Assistant of the White House Office from 1950 to 1953 under President Harry S. Truman. During the following year, he was a professor of public administration at Cornell and, from 1954 to 1964, taught government at Columbia University, where he received a Woodrow Wilson Foundation Award in 1961.

It was at Columbia that Neustadt wrote the book Presidential Power (1960; a revised edition titled Presidential Power and the Modern Presidents: The Politics of Leadership appeared in 1990), in which he examined the decision-making process at the highest levels of government. He argued that the President is actually rather weak in the US government; is unable to effect significant change without the approval of the Congress; and in practice must rely on a combination of personal persuasion, professional reputation "inside the Beltway," and public prestige to get things done.

With his book appearing just before the election of John F. Kennedy, Neustadt soon found himself in demand by the President-elect, and began his advisory role with a 20-page memo suggesting things the President should and should not try to do at the beginning of his term.  During the 1960s, Neustadt continued to advise Kennedy and later Lyndon B. Johnson.

Neustadt was elected to the American Academy of Arts and Sciences in 1964 and the American Philosophical Society in 1967.

Neustadt was hired by the then-secretary of Health, Education, and Welfare Joseph A. Califano Jr. to write a book analyzing the decision making that led to the swine flu vaccine debacle in the mid-1970s. Neustadt's co-author, his graduate assistant Harvey V. Fineberg, said later that the book was written as a private document for Califano, who later insisted on publishing it as The Swine Flu Affair: Decision-Making on a Slippery Disease. The book placed blame for the swine flu vaccine decision on the CDC Director David Sencer, though Sencer's recommendations were appropriate, given the information available at the time.

Personal life
Neustadt was a professor at Harvard Kennedy School at Harvard, where he taught as a popular professor for more than two decades and officially retired in 1989 but continued to teach there for years thereafter.  Neustadt also served as the first director of the Harvard Institute of Politics (IOP), which was founded as "a living memorial to President John F. Kennedy that engages young people in politics and public service."

His first wife, Bertha Cummings "Bert" Neustadt, died in 1984. In 1987, he married the British politician Shirley Williams, who also served on the faculty at the Kennedy School of Government as Professor of Electoral Politics.

Neustadt was also a recipient of the 1988 University of Louisville Grawemeyer Award for Ideas Improving World Order, co-authored with Ernest R. May.

After his retirement, he served as an advisor to Bill Clinton and as chairman of the Presidential Debates Commission.

One of Neustadt's closest students was a young Al Gore, whose interest in politics was reignited by a junior seminar taught by Neustadt in 1968 on the presidency. In the course, Gore role-played Kennedy during the Cuban Missile Crisis. Gore arranged to have private tutorials with Neustadt during his senior year and met with him for two hours weekly.

Death
Neustadt died in London after complications from a fall.  In addition to Shirley Williams, Neustadt left a daughter, Elizabeth, and a granddaughter. His son, Richard, predeceased him in 1995.

Books

1960: Presidential Power and the Modern Presidents: The Politics of Leadership
1970: Alliance Politics
1986: Thinking In Time : The Uses Of History For Decision Makers, co-authored with Ernest R. May
1999: Report to JFK: The Skybolt Crisis in Perspective
2000: Preparing to be President: The Memos of Richard E. Neustadt, co-authored with Charles O. Jones,

Media
Appearances as moderator
 Cuban Missile Crisis Revisited. Produced for The Idea Channel by the Free to Choose Network, 1983.
Phase I (U1015) (January 22, 1983)
 Featuring McGeorge Bundy, Edwin Martin, Dean Rusk & Donald Wilson in Atlanta, Georgia.
 Phase II, Part I (U1016) (June 27, 1983)
 Featuring McGeorge Bundy, Robert S. McNamara, George W. Ball & U. Alexis Johnson in Washington D.C.
 Phase II, Part II (U1017) (June 27, 1983)
 Featuring McGeorge Bundy, Robert S. McNamara, George W. Ball & U. Alexis Johnson in Washington D.C.

"The American President"

Provided commentary for the 2000 PBS film series: "The American President" produced by Kunhardt Productions.
Written, produced and directed by Philip B. Kunhardt, Jr., Philip B. Kunhardt III, Peter W. Kunhardt in
association with Thirteen/WNET-TV New York. Based on the book: "The American President" published by
Riverhead Books. The ten program series explores the presidencies from George Washington to Bill Clinton.

References

External links

 
 Harvard University Gazette obituary
 Associated Press obituary
  Guardian obituary
 Telegraph obituary
 Neustadt on William Howard Taft 
 Neustadt on Calvin Coolidge
 Richard E. Neustadt and Harvey V. Fineberg. The Swine Flu Affair: Decision-Making on a Slippery Disease. U.S. Department of Health, Education, and Welfare. July 1978. (Neustadt and Fineberg's classic study of decision-making under extreme uncertainty.)

1919 births
2003 deaths
20th-century American historians
20th-century American male writers
American male non-fiction writers
American political writers
Columbia University faculty
Harvard University alumni
Harvard University faculty
Historians from Pennsylvania
Historians of the United States
Jewish American historians
Public administration scholars
Spouses of life peers
Truman administration personnel
United States Navy officers
University of California, Berkeley alumni
Urban Institute people
Writers from Philadelphia
Members of the American Philosophical Society